The FEMTO-ST Institute (Franche-Comté Électronique Mécanique Thermique et Optique - Sciences et Technologies) is a mixed research unit associated with CNRS (UMR 6174) and attached simultaneously with:
 The University of Franche-Comté (UFC),
 École nationale supérieure de mécanique et des microtechniques (ENSMM),
 Université de technologie de Belfort-Montbéliard (UTBM).
FEMTO-ST is therefore a part of the association, University of Burgundy - Franche-Comté (UBFC).

History
This institute was created on  January 1, 2004 from the merging of five different Franche-Comté laboratories working in mechanics, optics and telecommunications, electronics, time-frequency, energetics, and fluidics. In 2011, UFC's informatics laboratory was incorporated into FEMTO-ST, becoming the 7th department in the institute.  

In January 2012, the LIFC laboratory of the University of Franche-Comté partnered with FEMTO-ST to form a seventh department: Department of Complex Systems Computing (DISC). Two years later, as a part of the TEMIS Science project, the extension works in the cleanroom was completed by increasing its area on 865 m² more to its initial extension. In 2014, the second part of the project is completed by the inauguration of the new building which hosts the headquarters and the departments of Optics and MN2S.

FEMTO-ST has also become one of the biggest research institute in the field of science of engineering in France. It has presence over Franche-Comté on the three geographical sites Besançon, Belfort, and Montbéliard.

Departments 
FEMTO-ST Institute is formed by 7 departments, supported by different common services in state-of-the-art micro/nanofabrication, constituting part of the six national technology center networks of CNRS (RENATECH).

Energy department 
It studies the production systems of conversion and storing of thermal and electric energy.
 SHARPAC: Systèmes électriques Hybrides, ActionneuRs électriques, systèmes Piles A Combustible (Hybrid Electric Systems, Electric Actuators, Fuel Cell Systems)
- Static converters

- Fuel cell systems

- PHIL – Power Hardware in the Loop

- Control and Management of Energy

- Electric actuators
 THERMIE: THermique Écoulements instRuMentatIon et Énergie (Thermal Runoff, Instrumentation, and Energy)
- Metrology and Instrumentation in Fluidics and Thermal Science

- Thermal Science in energy systems

- Heat engines

- Complex flows

Micro Nano Sciences and Systems Department (MN2S) 
The MN2S is a department of FEMTO-ST specialized in the research on micro- and nano-instrumentation, nanoscience, micro and nano acoustics, microsystems and multiphysics and the micro and nanomaterials and surface. The department is located in Besançon, Montbéliard and Belfort.

Research teams:
 BioMicroDevices
 Micro-Nano-Materials and Surfaces (MINAMAS)
 Micro-Opto-Electro Mechanical Systems (MOEMS)
 Nanosciences
 Phononics and Microscopy

Complex Systems Computer Science Department (DISC) 
The research performed at the department are focused on E-health, micro and nanosystems dedicated to health, information safety on the complex systems, MiDi Micro and distributed intelligent nanosystems, and the transport and mobility services. The department is located in Besançon, Montéliard, and Belfort.

Research teams:
 Distributed Numerical Algorithms (AND)
 Distributed Algorithmic Collaboration, Networks, Optimization and Scheduling (CARTOON)
 Optimization, Mobility, Networking (OMNI)
 Verification and validation of software and embedded systems (VESONTIO)

Time and Frequency Department 
This department is specialized on high stability oscillators, acoustical-electronicals and piezoelectrics, and time-frequency metrology.
It is composed by three teams:
 ACEPI: Acoustic-electronics and piezoelectrics
 CoSyMA :Composants et Systèmes Micro-Acoustiques
 OHMS: Ondes, Horloges, Métrologie et Systèmes

Automatic Control and Micro-Mechatronic Systems Department 
This department is specialized in robotics, mechatronics, automatic control and artificial intelligence.

It is composed of four teams:
 Control and Design (CODE)
 Biomedical Microrobotics (MiNaRoB)
 Prognostics and Health Management (PHM)
 Sensing strategies, Perception and Characterization at the Micro-Nanoscales (SPECIMEN)

Applied Mechanics Department
The Applied Mechanics Department is focus on two main areas, which are :
 Micromechanics: materials and processes
 Structures: integration and functionalization
It then counts 11 teams, working on these 2 research areas.

Optics Department
The Optics Department works on nanometrology, near-field microscopy, integrated optics in lithium niobate, ultrafast optics, nonlinear optics, and opto-electronic dynamics.

Research groups:
 Nano-Optics (NO)
 Nonlinear Optics group (ONL)
 Optoelectroncs, Photonics and Telecommunication Optics (OPTO)
 Photonics for Medical Instrumentation (PIM)

Research quality evaluation
The institute received an A+ grade from an evaluation performed by AERES in 2010, placing the institute in the de facto list of the top 30% research laboratories for engineering science in France.

References

External links
 

Research institutes established in 2004
Education in Besançon
French National Centre for Scientific Research